Stereorhachis is an extinct genus of non-mammalian synapsids from the Late Carboniferous of France.

See also
 List of pelycosaurs

References

 Sumida, S. J. & Martin, K. L. M. (eds.). Amniote Origins - Completing the Transition to Land. Academic Press, 1997. 510 p.
 Carroll, R. L. Vertebrate Paleontology and Evolution. W. H Freeman Company, 1988.

Ophiacodontids
Carboniferous synapsids
Fossils of France
Fossil taxa described in 1880
Prehistoric synapsid genera